Jan Chryzostom Zachariasiewicz (1823–1906; Zacharyasiewicz, Zacharjasiewicz) was a Polish novelist and journalist.

Biography
Zachariasiewicz was born on 11 September 1823 in Radymno. During 1842–44 he was a prisoner of Špilberk Castle. Co-editor of Tygodnik Polski, where he published poem Machabeusze. For publishing this work and also for participation in Revolutions of 1848, Zachariasiewicz was imprisoned in Terezín for two years.
He was a nephew or grandnephew of the bishop Franciszek Zachariasiewicz (1770–1845).

He died on 7 May 1906 in Krzywcza.

Works
In Lviv Zachariasiewicz was publishing and editing magazines:
 Postęp (1848), a radical political magazine, with K. Widman
 Tygodnik Polski (1849)
 Nowiny (1854–1856)
 Kółko Rodzinne (1860)

His notable novels include:
 Skromne nadzieje (1854)
 Na kresach (1860)
 Święty Jur (1862), vol. 1–3
 Człowiek bez jutra (1871)
 Zły interes (1876)
 Wybór pism (1886–1888), a collection of works, vol. 1–11

References
 
 

1823 births
1906 deaths
People from Radymno
19th-century Polish journalists
Polish male novelists
19th-century Polish novelists
19th-century Polish male writers